Marlene Rosemarie Mallett (born 1959) is a British Anglican bishop and sociologist. Since June 2022, she has served as the Bishop of Croydon, an area bishop in the Diocese of Southwark. 

Before ordination in the Church of England, she was a research sociologist and academic, specialising in international development and ethno-cultural mental health. She was priest-in-charge and then Vicar of St John the Evangelist, Angell Town from 2007 to 2020; and Archdeacon of Croydon from 2020 to 2022. 

On 3 May 2022, it was announced that Mallett had been appointed as the next Bishop of Croydon; she was consecrated as a bishop on 24 June at Southwark Cathedral.

References

1959 births
Living people
Archdeacons of Croydon
21st-century English Anglican priests
British sociologists
British women sociologists
Women Anglican clergy